PowerJet is a Franco-Russian 50-50 joint venture created in 2004 by aeronautical engine manufacturers Snecma (Safran) and NPO Saturn. The company is in charge  of the SaM146 program – the sole powerplant for the Sukhoi Superjet 100 airliner – including design, production, marketing and after-sales support. It delivers a complete propulsion system, comprising engine, nacelle and equipment.

PowerJet has two production sites: one in Villaroche (France) and the other in Rybinsk (Russia).

History 

Snecma and NPO Saturn began cooperating in 1998, when Snecma subcontracted the production of CFM56 engine parts to NPO Saturn. In 2004, the creation of the PowerJet joint venture took the collaboration a step further. 

In 2005, the production plant VolgAero was founded in Rybinsk, in order to make parts for the SaM146, as well as parts and assemblies for other engines produced by the two parent companies.

In 2007, Snecma and NPO Saturn built an open-air test cell in Poluevo, near Rybinsk, to handle certification tests for the SaM146. It is the only open-air test facility for this type of engine in Europe and it also provides test services for other engines.

On 23 June 2010, it was announced that EASA certified PowerJet for its SaM146 engine. It gained Russian certification in August 2010 and the following year the Superjet 100 entered service.

References

Multinational aircraft engine manufacturers
Aircraft engine manufacturers of Russia
Joint ventures
Safran Group